Jason Forbes (born 27 October 1990) is a British actor, writer, comedian, impressionist, and TV presenter. He is best known for the CITV series Horrible Science; The Mash Report on BBC Two; as PC Peasey in the Professor Branestawm movies on BBC One; and as a member of the award-winning sketch trio 'Daphne'.

Forbes is co-creator, star and writer of the BBC Radio 4 series, Daphne Sounds Expensive.

Early life and education
Forbes was born in Bristol, England, and educated at Queen Elizabeth's Hospital in Clifton. He then went up to Jesus College at the University of Cambridge to read English, graduating in 2012.

At school he joined the 'Gabblers' Club' – a Bristol-based after-dinner speaking society for young students; and, in 2008, was awarded the Gabblers' prize for 'Best Speaker' – a prize formerly awarded to stand-up comedian Mark Watson.

At Cambridge University, Forbes wrote and performed in a number of comedy shows as a member of the famous Cambridge Footlights. In 2012, he co-wrote and performed in Perfect Strangers – the Footlights' 50th annual revue – touring the UK and the United States. He also performed in a number of 'serious plays', from contemporary to Shakespeare; and on London's West End as part of a showcase directed by former Artistic Director of the Royal Court Theatre, Max Stafford-Clark.

Prior to becoming a professional actor, Forbes worked as a marketing executive, civil servant, computer programmer, web designer, graphic designer and teacher of languages.

Career

Comedy

In September 2014, Forbes reunited with his Cambridge Footlights contemporaries Phil Wang and George Fouracres to form the sketch group 'Daphne'.

The trio began hosting a comedy night called Nova Nova, every other month at the Cockpit Theatre, Marylebone, where they trialled their new material alongside guests, including British comedians Harry Hill and James Acaster.

Daphne went on to win the London Sketchfest's prize for 'Best New Act' in 2015. Their first Edinburgh Festival Fringe show, Daphne Do Edinburgh, was critically acclaimed and Daphne were nominated for the 2015 Foster's (formerly Perrier) Award for 'Best Newcomer'.

Radio

Daphne Sounds Expensive (BBC Radio 4)
In February 2016, the BBC announced that Daphne would be bringing a "Goon Show-esque" comedy called Daphne Sounds Expensive to BBC Radio 4, with the first episode airing on 14 July 2016. The series consists of four thirty-minute episodes.

Daphne Sounds Expensive was shortlisted for the 'Best Radio Sketch Show' award at the Comedy.co.uk Awards 2016. Radio 4 commissioned a second series which it would broadcast from 13 July 2017.

Other radio work
Forbes is a regular guest on the satirical sketch show Newsjack on BBC Radio 4 Extra.

In 2017 he appeared in the two-part BBC Radio 4 sitcom Life on Egg by Daniel Maier, alongside Harry Hill, Marek Larwood and Gyles Brandreth.

Film and television
Forbes made his first TV appearance in 2013 in Kerry, a BBC Three 'Comedy Feed' episode by comedic actress Kerry Howard.

He later appeared in The Mimic on Channel 4 and Pompidou by Little Britain star Matt Lucas on BBC One.

In 2014, he appeared on BBC One alongside Harry Hill, David Mitchell, Ben Miller, Miranda Richardson, Simon Day and Charlie Higson, as PC Peasey in Higson's adaptation of The Incredible Adventures of Professor Branestawm by Norman Hunter.

In May 2015, ITV announced that Forbes would among the cast of their new series Horrible Science, based on the Horrible Science books by Nick Arnold.

Forbes also joined the cast of Tracey Ullman's new sketch show, Tracey Ullman's Show, for BBC One and HBO. He will be a regular in the next series of Tracey Ullman's Show, and will portray former American World No. 1 professional tennis player, Arthur Ashe, in the 2017 movie Borg/McEnroe, starring Sverrir Gudnason and Shia LaBeouf.

In 2021, broadcaster UKTV announced that Forbes would be joining Kemah Bob and Tom Allen as co-host of a new panel show called The Island on its comedy channel Dave. The show was co-created by comedians John Robins, Lloyd Langford, Ed Gamble, and James Acaster. Recording of the first eight episodes began in June 2021.

He has also joined the cast of Netflix’s upcoming sci-fi, The Three Body Problem.

Style and influences
Forbes is a lover of physical comedy and often incorporates slapstick humour into his routines. He has cited Laurel and Hardy, Charlie Chaplin, Rowan Atkinson, the late Sir Norman Wisdom and, "most of all", Michael Crawford among his physical influences. "Against all advice," says Forbes in an interview with online blog Comedy Blogedy, "I'd try everything they did at home: bumping into things, falling over, deliberately spilling stuff and – to my mother's horror – throwing myself down the stairs."

Forbes apparently perfected his stair-fall in a university production of Michael Frayn's Noises Off.

Of his sketch group Daphne's debut Edinburgh Festival Fringe show, The List magazine's Brian Donaldson remarked upon a "wild slapstick moment that will hopefully not result in an injury to Forbes before August is out."

Credits

Film and television

Radio

Video games

Awards and nominations 
Forbes' sketch group Daphne were the winners of the London Sketchfest's prize for 'Best New Act' in 2015. Their first Edinburgh Festival Fringe show, Daphne Do Edinburgh, was critically acclaimed and Daphne were nominated for the 2015 Edinburgh Comedy Award for 'Best Newcomer'.

References

1990 births
People educated at Queen Elizabeth's Hospital, Bristol
Alumni of Jesus College, Cambridge
British sketch comedians
English male comedians
English male film actors
English male television actors
Black British male actors
21st-century English male actors
English male radio actors
English male stage actors
British comedy writers
Living people
English people of Jamaican descent
English people of Dominica descent
Male actors from Bristol